Louverval is a village in the Doignies commune in the Nord department in northern France.

In 1918 it was the site of a minor battle between the Australian 11th Battalion and the Germans during World War I in which Charles Pope won a posthumous Victoria Cross. It is the location of the Cambrai Memorial to the Missing (Louverval Military Cemetery).

Geography of Nord (French department)